The Hopman Cup XXX (also known as the 2018 Mastercard Hopman Cup for sponsorship reasons) was the 30th edition of the Hopman Cup tournament between nations in men's and women's tennis. It took place at the Perth Arena in Perth, Western Australia.

France were the defending champions; however they did not return to defend their title. This marked the first edition without France competing since 2010.

Switzerland defeated Germany in the final to win its third title.

Entrants

Seeds
The draw took place on 5 October 2017 and it placed the 8 teams into two groups, according to the following ranking-based seedings:

Replacement players

Group stage

Group A
All times are local (UTC+8).

Standings

Australia vs. Canada

Belgium vs. Germany

Canada vs. Germany

Australia vs. Belgium

Belgium vs. Canada

Notes. Due to Eugenie Bouchard's withdrawal from the mixed doubles rubber, the scores are counted as 4–0, 4–0 win for Belgium.

Australia vs. Germany

Group B
All times are local (UTC+8).

Standings

Russia vs. United States

Japan vs. Switzerland

Japan vs. United States

Notes. Maddison Inglis of Australia played instead of Naomi Osaka for the first match. Scores counted as 6–0, 6–0 win for Vandeweghe and 4–0, 4–0 win for the American mixed pair due to Naomi Osaka's withdrawal due to illness. Due to Jack Sock's retirement in the men's singles rubber, the second set is counted as 6–1 win for Sugita. Sock was replaced by Australian Pat Cash for the doubles match.

Russia vs. Switzerland

Japan vs. Russia

Switzerland vs. United States

Final

Germany vs. Switzerland

References

External links
 

2018 in tennis
2018
2018 in Australian tennis
January 2018 sports events in Australia
December 2017 sports events in Australia